Diarsia formosensis is a moth of the family Noctuidae. It is found in Taiwan.

The wingspan is 28–33 mm.

References

Moths described in 1914
Diarsia